Gondokoro island is located in Central Equatoria. Its importance lay in the fact that it was within a few kilometres of the limit of navigability of the Nile from Khartoum upstream. From this point the journey south to Uganda was continued overland.

The Austrian Catholic missionary Ignatius Knoblecher set up a mission there in 1852. It was abandoned in 1859.  Gondokoro was the scene for the arrival of John Hanning Speke and James Augustus Grant after their two years and five months long journey through Central Africa from Zanzibar. They arrived exhausted on February 13, 1863 and expected to be met by the British consul John Petherick and his rescue party. As Petherick was away hunting in the countryside, the two explorers instead were welcomed by Samuel Baker and his wife Florence Baker, who greeted them with a cup of tea.

In 1874 Charles George Gordon seized the town in favor of the khedive from the Khedivate of Egypt, thus ensuring Egypt's rule over all of southern Sudan (then the province of Equatoria).

A passage from Alan Moorehead´s The White Nile (p. 61) describes it thus: "The sportsman Samuel Baker and his wife had come up the Nile to look for them, and there had been others as well who had arrived at Gondokoro on the same mission, three Dutch ladies, the Baroness van Capellan and Mrs and Miss Tinne, but they had been forced to return to Khartoum through sickness. ... 
'Speke', Baker says, 'appeared the more worn of the two: he was excessively lean, but in reality he was in good tough condition; he had walked the whole way from Zanzibar, never having once ridden during that wearying march. Grant was in honourable rags; his bare knees projecting through the remnants of trousers that were an exhibition of rough industry tailor's work.'"

Theodore Roosevelt passed through Gondokoro on the Smithsonian–Roosevelt African Expedition with his son, Kermit Roosevelt, Edgar Alexander Mearns, Edmund Heller, and John Alden Loring.

The site of Gondokoro is near to the modern-day city of Juba. Other notable nearby settlements include Lado and Rejaf (Rageef).

References
 
 

Populated places in Jubek State